Western Delta University is located in Oghara, Delta State, Nigeria. It was established in 2007 and is a private university. The National Universities Commission NUC, Nigeria has officially approved Western Delta University WDU.

Western Delta University was founded by a group of Urhobo Scholars under the auspices of the Urhobo Advancement Foundation (UAF) who saw the need for a privately financed university in the wetlands of Delta State, Nigeria. Since its establishment in 2007, WDU has offered access to a wide range of academic opportunities.

Admission 
Western Delta University admits students via JAMB UTME and Direct Entry into various courses. Requirements for admission into Western Delta University are GCE O/Level, SSCE, NECO or NABTEB credit level passes in at least five (5) subjects including English Language, Mathematics, and one relevant science or social science subject obtained at not more than two (2) sittings. Direct Entry candidates are expected to possess a good Diploma (with minimum of lower credit), NCE (with minimum of merit) from recognized institutions OR 2 Advanced Level GCE passes in relevant subjects.

Administration

Faculties 
The School has four Faculties which are:

 College of Natural & Applied Sciences 
 College of Social & Management Sciences.
 College of Applied Health Sciences
 College of Law

Departments 
The following are the courses currently offered by the School:

Biochemistry,

Microbiology and Biotechnology,

Basic And Industrial Chemistry,

Mathematics & Computer Science,

Computer Science,

Pure and Industrial Mathematics,

Physics and Energy Studies,

Physics & Electronics,

Geology & Petroleum Studies,

Accounting,

Economics,

Hotel and Tourism Management,

Business Administration,

Mass Communication,

Political Science and Public Administration and

Sociology,

Plant Science and Micro Biology,

International Relations.

Medical Laboratory Science

Nursing Science

Law

Library 
The library's main objectives are to provide essential resources and services that will enhance the university's principal curricula for education, research, and learning.

The University's researchers and students have unrestricted access to research literature and other information resources from significant databases and institutions throughout the world thanks to the strategically developed research services, trainings, and supports. As is possible in modern libraries all over the world, we have also built our Institutional Repository, which makes the intellectual outputs of WDU accessible to the public.

See also 
Academic libraries in Nigeria

References

External links
Western Delta University website
Nigeria: Western Delta Varsity Takes Off in Oghara

Educational institutions established in 2007
Universities and colleges in Nigeria
2007 establishments in Nigeria
Education in Delta State
Private universities and colleges in Nigeria
Academic libraries in Nigeria